John Elliott Ward (October 2, 1814 – November 30, 1902) was an American politician and diplomat.

Biography
John Elliott Ward was born in Sunbury, Georgia on October 2, 1814.

He served as United States Attorney for Georgia, mayor of Savannah, Georgia, speaker of the Georgia House of Representatives, president of the Georgia State Senate, president of the 1856 Democratic National Convention, and United States Minister to China under James Buchanan. He resigned from his diplomatic post shortly after the outbreak of the American Civil War, returned to Savannah, and after the war, moved to New York City, where he practiced law for several years.

He died in Dorchester (now Midway), Georgia on November 30, 1902.

See also
 List of speakers of the Georgia House of Representatives

References

External links
  The Confederate Career of John Elliott Ward

1814 births
1902 deaths
Democratic Party members of the Georgia House of Representatives
Democratic Party Georgia (U.S. state) state senators
Georgia (U.S. state) lawyers
Ambassadors of the United States to China
Mayors of Savannah, Georgia
New York (state) lawyers
19th-century American diplomats
People of the Second Opium War